Pain Velayat Rural District is a rural district (dehestan) in the Central District of Torbat-e Heydarieh County, Razavi Khorasan Province, Iran. At the 2006 census, its population was 10,375, in 2,782 families.  The rural district has 30 villages.

References 

Rural Districts of Razavi Khorasan Province
Torbat-e Heydarieh County